North Dakota is a leading U.S. state in wind power generation. The state generated 26.8% of its electricity from wind during year 2017, enough to power over one million homes.

2,996 megawatts (MW) of generation capacity had been installed for wind power in North Dakota at the end of 2017. Additional capacity had been limited by transmission line constraints until the completion of a transmission line from Fargo to central Minnesota in 2015. Capacity further reached 3,628 MW in 2019.

Very favorable wind conditions in the state enable wind farms to achieve capacity factors in excess of 40 percent. The 105 MW Thunder Spirit wind farm, completed in 2015, was expected to have a capacity factor greater than 45 percent.

Wind farms in North Dakota

North Dakota hosts a growing number of utility-scale wind farms in all regions of the state (view map at left).  The largest is the 497 MW Bison Wind Energy Center completed in year 2015.  The state had the highest per-capita wind generation in the nation in 2017 according to data from the U.S. Energy Information Administration (see figure at right).

Statistics 

Source:

Seasonal generation
North Dakota wind generation is strong year-round, and tends to be strongest during the spring and fall.

See also

Solar power in North Dakota
Wind power in the United States
List of wind farms in the United States

References

External links

 North Dakota Wind Activities